Andrei Ștefan Enescu (born 12 October 1987) is a Romanian professional footballer who plays as a midfielder for Liga III club Avântul Reghin.

Honours
SCM Gloria Buzău
Liga III: 2018–19

References

External links
 
 
 

1987 births
Living people
People from Drobeta-Turnu Severin
Romanian footballers
Association football midfielders
Liga I players
Liga II players
Liga III players
Moldovan Super Liga players
Cypriot First Division players
FC Drobeta-Turnu Severin players
FC Steaua II București players
CS Pandurii Târgu Jiu players
FC Sheriff Tiraspol players
ACF Gloria Bistrița players
Bőcs KSC footballers
Mezőkövesdi SE footballers
FC Vaslui players
CS Gaz Metan Mediaș players
FC Politehnica Iași (2010) players
Ethnikos Achna FC players
ACS Poli Timișoara players
FC UTA Arad players
FC Gloria Buzău players
CS Gloria Bistrița-Năsăud footballers
Romanian expatriate footballers
Romanian expatriate sportspeople in Moldova
Expatriate footballers in Moldova
Romanian expatriate sportspeople in Hungary
Expatriate footballers in Hungary
Romanian expatriate sportspeople in Cyprus
Expatriate footballers in Cyprus